Year 1405 (MCDV) was a common year starting on Thursday (link will display the full calendar) of the Julian calendar, the 1405th year of the Common Era (CE) and Anno Domini (AD) designations, the 405th year of the 2nd millennium, the 5th year of the 15th century, and the 6th year of the 1400s decade.

Events 
 January–December 
 May 29 – In England, Ralph Neville, 1st Earl of Westmorland, meets Richard le Scrope, Archbishop of York and Earl of Norfolk Thomas Mowbray in Shipton Moor, tricks them to send their rebellious army home, and then imprisons them.
 June 8 – Richard le Scrope, Archbishop of York and Thomas Mowbray, Earl of Norfolk, are executed in York on Henry IV's orders.
 July 11 – Ming Dynasty fleet commander Zheng He sets sail from Suzhou, to explore the world for the first time.
 October 5 – Christine de Pizan writes a letter to Queen Isabeau, urging her to intervene in the political struggle between the dukes of Burgundy and Orléans.
 November 17 – The Sultanate of Sulu is established on the Sulu Archipelago, off the coast of Mindanao in the Philippines.

 Date unknown 
 Bath Abbey is built in England.
 The first record is written of whiskey being consumed in Ireland, where it is distilled by Catholic monks.
 Bellifortis, a book on military technology, is published by Konrad Kyeser.
 Christine de Pizan writes The Book of the City of Ladies.

Births 
 February 8 – Constantine XI, last Byzantine Emperor (d. 1453)
 February 22 – Gilbert Kennedy, 1st Lord Kennedy, Scottish noble (d. 1489)
 March 6 – King John II of Castile (d. 1454)
 May 6 – George Kastrioti, better known as Skanderbeg, Albanian national hero (d. 1468) (probable date)
 October 18 – Pope Pius II (d. 1464)
 date unknown – Louis I, Count of Montpensier (d. 1486)
 Cecilia of Brandenburg, Duchess of Brunswick-Wolfenbüttel (d. 1449)

Deaths 
 January 12 – Eleanor Maltravers, English noblewoman (b. 1345)
 February 14 – Timur (aka Tamerlane), Turco-Mongol monarch and conqueror (b. 1336)
 March 16 – Margaret III, Countess of Flanders (b. 1350)
 April 19 – Thomas West, 1st Baron West (b. 1335)
 May 29 – Philippe de Mézières, advisor to Charles V of France
 June 8
 Thomas de Mowbray, 4th Earl of Norfolk, English rebel, executed in York (b. 1385)
 Richard le Scrope, Archbishop of York, executed in York (b. c.1350)
 c. July 20 – Alexander Stewart, Earl of Buchan, the "Wolf of Badenoch", fourth son of King Robert II of Scotland (b. 1343)
 probable – Jean Froissart, French chronicler (b. 1337)

References